Robert Earl Claver (May 22, 1928 – December 14, 2017) was an American director and producer.

Born in Chicago, Illinois, where he earned his journalism degree at University of Illinois and served in the army for two years. Claver began his career in 1959, as producing an episode on the variety television series The Jimmie Rodgers Show. He also made his directional debut in 1963, as directing an episode for the American military comedy television series Ensign O'Toole.

Later in his career, Claver directed and produced for other television programs, as his credits includes, Small Wonder, The Partridge Family, Rhoda, The Bob Newhart Show, Mork & Mindy, Here Comes the Brides, The Farmer's Daughter, Welcome Back, Kotter, The New Leave It to Beaver, Charles in Charge, Gloria, The Girl with Something Extra, The Dukes of Hazzard and Captain Kangaroo. He retired his career in 1991, last directing for the television series Out of This World.

Claver died in December 2017 in Redding, California, at the age of 89.

References

External links 

1928 births
2017 deaths
People from Chicago
University of Illinois alumni
American television directors
American television producers